The Sigma 70-200mm f2.8 EX DG OS HSM is a camera lens produced by the Sigma Corporation.

Features

The lens features an Optical Stabiliser function, which in turn enables the use of shutter speeds up to four stops slower than would otherwise be possible. The OS functionality also enables low-light photography. The lens has an ultrasonic motor.

Specifications

References

camera labs
sigmaphoto product
photozone sigma 70-200

070-200